Frances Mercer (October 21, 1915 – November 12, 2000) was an American film actress.

Biography
She appeared in the films Vivacious Lady, Blind Alibi, Crime Ring, Smashing the Rackets, The Mad Miss Manton, Annabel Takes a Tour, Beauty for the Asking, Society Lawyer, The Story of Vernon and Irene Castle, Piccadilly Incident, There's Always Tomorrow and Young and Dangerous.

She died on November 12, 2000, in Los Angeles, California at age 85.

Filmography

References

External links
 

1915 births
2000 deaths
20th-century American actresses
American film actresses